"High and Low" is a song by Australian electronic duo Empire of the Sun. It was released in 24 August 2016 as the lead single from their third studio album, Two Vines.

Group member Nick Littlemore gave details of the track during its premiere on American radio station KROQ, saying "It was about this girl I knew when I was a kid, named Alice D, who was a bit of a wild child. She did all sorts of crazy things. We wanted to write a song that captured the innocence and bravery of youth...being a teenager, having the experience of throwing caution to the wind and trying wild things for the first time." (Some fans have interpreted "Alice D" as a play on LSD, but the group members insist that such is far from the case.)

The song features on a Holden commercial airing during the eighth season of The X Factor Australia and features host Jason Dundas. This song was also featured in EA Sports game, FIFA 17, and Danish series The Rain as soundtrack. The song is also featured in TV commercials for San Pellegrino sparkling water.

Additional remixes were released in October 2016.

Critical reception
Ryan Reed from Rolling Stone described the song as "pulsating", adding; "Acoustic guitar chords give way to booming synth-pads on the chorus, as singer Luke Steele sings wistfully: 'If I had my way/ Never let you go.'"

Collin Robinson from Stereogum described the song as "a slow-building slice of euphoria with big drums, grand synths, and swishing ambient sweeps."

Lars Brandle of Billboard described the song as "a straight-up party tune which flows with melodies, synths and good times."

Track listings

Charts

Weekly charts

Year-end charts

Certifications

References

Empire of the Sun (band) songs
2016 songs
2016 singles
Capitol Records singles
Songs written by Luke Steele (musician)
Songs written by Nick Littlemore
Songs written by Peter Mayes